Falun is a city and the seat of Falun Municipality in Dalarna County, Sweden, with 37,291 inhabitants in 2010. It is also the capital of Dalarna County. Falun forms, together with Borlänge, a metropolitan area with just over 100,000 inhabitants.

Falun was originally famous for its copper mine, and is today an important service and industrial city even though the mine is closed (since 1992).

Faluån is a river, flowing through the city, separating it into two sides. Falu copper mine is located on one of the sides which during many centuries was one of Sweden's main business. This side of the river was usually called "the mining side", where not many plants grew due to the toxic smoke which contaminated the soil. On the other side of the river, where the smoke did not reach, set many large villas, which made this side to be called "the delightful side". The centre of Falun consists of classical pedestrian streets with small shops. In 1998, the city reclaimed the award of "the city centre of the year" in Sweden.

In 2001, the city, the copper mine, and mining areas of Falun were added to the list of world heritage sites by the United Nations, which means that the city is worth preserving, as it is considered to be of interest for all of humanity. Dalarna University, with its 18 000 students, has a campus located in Falun ― close to the national ski stadium where the ski world championship has taken place a number of times, including the last one in 2015.

The name of Falun has influenced the names of some Swedish items associated with the town, such as Falu red (a paint color), Falu rågrut (a snack), Falu ättika (a type of vinegar) and Falukorv.

History 

The town of Falun is known to have existed in the 14th century as a market place for the surrounding lands. Mining for copper had been a local business since the mid-13th century, or possibly as early as 1000, and the organisation for the extracting of copper and gold from Stora Kopparberget is believed to be the oldest still-existing enterprise in the world, proved active since 1347, when its charter was granted by King Magnus IV of Sweden. The first share in the company is dated as early as 1288.

However, an enterprise at that time was nothing more than a cooperative among the owners, each contributing with a share of money for construction, tools, etc., necessary to run the organisation.  Depending on their contributions they could use the facilities and share the profits in proportion to the relative sizes of their individual contributions.

The city of Falun received its privileges in 1641.  By then Falun was already one of the largest cities in Sweden, with about 6000 inhabitants. Soon, however, the importance of the copper mine began to decrease. In 1687, parts of the mine collapsed in a landslide, creating a 100 m deep pit. Even though the mine remained in use for the next 300 years, the production gradually diminished, until it closed down in 1992.

The mining area of the Falun Mine has been declared a UNESCO World Heritage Site, which also was the name of the mining company of Falun, is today a part of Stora Enso.

During World War II, Falun was the place where the authorities "interned" British and American airmen who happened to land in Sweden or reached the country after landing in German-controlled territories. Unlike civilian refugees from Germany, who were kept in internment camps throughout the country, British and American airmen were placed in hotels and bed and breakfast establishments in the Falun area, and enjoyed relative freedom.

Climate

Falun has a humid continental climate (Dfb).

Winter is the longest season lasting approximately from mid-November until the end of March, although March daytime temperatures tend to be mild. However, the all-time heat record was set on August 4, 2014, when  was measured. This was, in turn, the highest measured temperature of the intense heatwave that summer that affected most of Scandinavia. The climate of Falun is more continental than most of Sweden since it is relatively far from large bodies of waters moderating temperatures. As a result, the highs of July in Falun are normally warmer than many areas much further south in the country. Winters, however, are cold but also highly variable due to the proximity to some maritime influence that often brings mild temperatures above freezing, moderating average temperatures.
The most precipitation occurs during the summer months of July and August. 
The weather station has however, not recorded below  according to the open data.

Architectural history

Stora Gruvstugan was designed by Eric Geisler and built between 1771 and 1785 in a Rococo Style, also referred to as Late Baroque. The building is situated by Falun Copper Mine and used to be the main office to the copper mine. In 1882 the building was rebuilt into Berslagets museum. At the beginning of 1920, the mining came close to the structure which made it fragile and extensive repairs were made to the building.

Västra Skolan was built in 1915, based on a design by the city architect in Falun, Klas Boman. The building functioned as a school up until 2010. The tower was a replica of Kristine Kyrka, XVIIth century parish church of Falun, from which one could view the entire low built the city.

Egnellska Huset was built in 1903, and was designed by Falun's first city architect, Klas Boman. The building functioned as a modern residential building. The building was initially a light yellow color and then later recolored in a more bright yellow color. After two separate fires in 2007 and 2008, the building was restored to its original appearance.

Falugatan is a street in Falun and has since the 15th century functioned as a connection between eastern and western Falun. Thanks to its location by the river, this site became an important commerce site for the city. When Falun, officially became a city, in 1641, it was this street that named the city to Falun. The street kept its appearance up until the 1960s when Falun was modernized architectural. During the 1960', four of the five 18th century buildings were demolished and today, the Körsnerska Huset is the only one remaining in its original appearance.

Centralpalatset is a building located on Stora Torget in Falun and is a monumental building, decorated in Art Nouveau. It was built between 1895-1896, and was designed by the local architect Ferdinand Boberg. The author Selma Lagerlöf lived in the building, and it was here she wrote The Wonderful Adventures of Nils. In 1947, the initial balconies were removed and in 1955 the whole building was facing a renovation where the facade was redesigned and the whole house scaled-down, making it shorter and flatter

Wiklunds Glas was a building on Åsgatan in Falun and was designed in a combination between Art Nouveau and Renaissance in the Low Countries. The building was designed by the Architect J.Wernfeldt and functioned as a location for a glass company. The building was demolished in 1971, when Falun was modernized.

Geislerska Huset was built sometime between 1765 and 1768 by Eric Geisler. The building was built by a technique which later became referred to as Eric Geisler Technique. It was the oldest building in the world built with copper slag stone. The building was demolished in 1977, and on the site today is an office building.

Rådhuset (Town Hall) is located on Stora Torget in Falun. Was built between 1649 and 1653, initially as a one-floor building, but in the 1960s, a second floor was added onto the building. In 1761, the building was destroyed in a fire, but was quickly rebuilt and is still, today, standing on the same site.

Varmbadhuset a community swimming pool facility in Falun. It was designed in a National Romantic Style by the city architect Klas Boman and built in 1911. In the 1960s a sports center was planned out for Falun and Varmbadhuset lost its importance and faced demolition in 1974, despite strong protests from the residents in Falun. On the site today is the police station.

In 1961, an architectural competition was organized in Falun. The neighborhood (Falan) between the western side of Stora Torget and Faluån was to be modernized. The competition was won by Uhlin och Malms Arkitektkontor in Stockholm. The final design was built in 1968, with two buildings along the western side of the Plaza. Since 1968, the buildings have been rebuilt many times.

Education 
There is a number of elementary schools in Falun, as well as a number of gymnasiums.

For education, the city holds part of the University College of Dalarna (Högskolan Dalarna).

Today
In sports, Falun hosts the annual Swedish Ski Games at its skiing arena Lugnet, Falun. The city's most successful sports team is the bandy team Falu BS which has played in the Swedish top division for many years. Also, IBF Falun, the floorball male and female teams, have been very successful. Falu FK play in Division 2 Norra Svealand.

Lugnet, Falun Stadium has also hosted the FIS Nordic World Ski Championships four times: 1954, 1974, 1993 and most recently in 2015.

The city lost out to Calgary, Alberta, Canada, in 1981 for the 1988 Winter Olympics.  Again, Falun applied for the 1992 Winter Olympics but lost out to Albertville, France, in 1986.  The city lost despite the best efforts of one of ABBA's singers who recorded a single in support of the bid.

Falun is the hometown of 'The Battle', one of the world's most famous snowboard competitions.

Iron and Copper byproducts from the mine are still used as a paint ingredient, in the production of the nationally well known and culturally important Falu Red paint, particularly used on wooden houses.

Notable people 

 Oscar Alin (1846–1900) historian and politician.
 Sture Bergwall, (born 1950), falsely convicted of serial murder
 Ferdinand Boberg, (1860–1946) architect
 Joakim Brodén, (born 1980) founder and lead vocalist of  power metal band Sabaton
 Civil War, (founded 2012) power metal band
 Elma Danielsson, (1865-1936), journalist and politician
 Björn Dixgård, (born 1981) musician (Mando Diao)
 Jorian Engelbrektsson, (born 1982) pinball champion 
 Fet-Mats, (died 1677) a natural mummy found in Sweden in 1719.
 Patrick Johansson, (born 1976) drummer
 Selma Lagerlöf, (1858–1940) author, awarded the 1909 Nobel Prize in Literature
 Lina Leandersson, (born 1995) actress
 Bertil Lintner, (born 1953) journalist
 Kristian Matsson (born 1983) musician, stage name The Tallest Man on Earth 
 Henrik Petrini, (1863–1957) mathematician
 Ernst Rolf, (1891–1932), actor and singer
 Sabaton, (founded 1999) power metal band
 Georg Skarstedt, (1900–1976) actor
 Vincent Skoglund, (born 1974), photographer
 Georg Stiernhielm, (1598–1672) civil servant, mathematician, linguist and poet.
 Gunnar Säve-Söderbergh, (1910–1948) palaeontologist and geologist.
 Pär Sundström, (born 1981) founder and Bassist of  power metal band Sabaton
 Twilight Force, (founded 2011) power metal band
 Putte Wickman, (1924–2006) jazz clarinetist

Sport 
 Adam Boqvist (born 2000), ice hockey player
 Jesper Boqvist (born 1998), ice hockey player
 Mattias Ekström (born 1978), racing driver
 Samuel Ersson (born 1999), ice hockey goaltender
 Maria Hjorth (born 1973), golfer
 Tomas Jonsson (born 1960, former ice hockey player, now coach
 Anders Kallur (born 1952), former ice hockey player
 Jenny Kallur (born 1981), athlete, World Championships finalist 2005 in 100 m hurdles
 Susanna Kallur (born 1981), athlete, World Record Holder 60 meter hurdles
 Marcus Ljungqvist (born 1974), former road bicycle racer
 Jenny Rissveds (born 1994), Olympic Champion Rio 2016, U23 Mountain Bike World Champion 2016
 Walter Steiner (born 1951), former ski jumper
 Ulf Stenlund (born 1967), former tennis player

In popular culture
The short story "Die Bergwerke zu Falun" ("The Mines of Falun") was published by E. T. A. Hoffmann in 1819, based on what happened to Fet-Mats Israelsson.

See also 
Biathlon World Championships
Falukorv
Thomas Quick
Älgen Stolta

Sports

The following sports clubs are located in Falun:

 Falu BS
 Falu FK
 Korsnäs IF FK
 Slätta SK
 IBF Falun

Annual music festival
Starting in 2008 Falun has been the home of a rock and metal festival called Sabaton Open Air: Rockstad Falun.

References

External links 
 
 
 Falun – Official site : falun.se
 Falun – Democracy City : falun.se/democracy

 
County seats in Sweden
Populated places in Dalarna County
Populated places in Falun Municipality
Municipal seats of Dalarna County
Swedish municipal seats
Mining communities in Sweden
Ski areas and resorts in Sweden
Populated lakeshore places in Sweden
Cities in Dalarna County